Suriya Paarvai is a 1999 Tamil-language action crime film directed by Jagan. The film stars Arjun and newcomer Pooja. It was released on 14 January 1999 to negative reviews. The film is copied from the Luc Besson 1994 film Léon: The Professional. The film was partially reshot in Telugu as Hello Friend.

Plot

Vijay is a hitman who works for Sundaramoorthy. He kills anybody for a price, other than women and children, and he lives alone in an apartment. Pooja, a young girl, studies in a boarding school and comes to her father's house for the holiday. Between her abusive father, selfish stepmother and an arrogant step-aunt, Pooja feels rather badly, but she treasures her lovely little brother Dinesh. Pooja tries to befriend Vijay, but Vijay is not interested. Her father is a drug smuggler. One day, a corrupt police officer Jayanth, kills Pooja's family, including her brother. Vijay decides to accommodate Pooja, and Pooja compels him to teach her his skills as a hitman. What transpires later forms the crux of the story.

Cast

Arjun as Vijay
Pooja Priyanka as Pooja
Raghuvaran as Jayanth
Vijayakumar as Narayanan
Radha Ravi as Sundaramoorthy
Goundamani as Raj Bharath / Nattamai
Senthil as Pichai Perumal / Sundaram
Chinni Jayanth as Inspector Pichai Perumal
Manjula Vijayakumar as Lakshmi
Mahanadi Dinesh as Dinesh
Sindhu as Sindhu
Prasad Babu as Pooja's father
Alphonsa as Sheela
S. N. Lakshmi as Lakshmi's mother
Naren as Kannan, Jayanth's henchman
Master Mahendran as Vijay (child)
Vimalraj as George
Rani
Kavitha Sree
Jaya Mani
K. K. Soundar
Kalaignanam (guest appearance)

Production
The film's story and screenplay were written by Arjun's assistant Jagan, who also made his directorial debut. Pooja Priyanka, daughter of actress Subhashini and niece of Jayasudha, was cast in the lead role opposite Arjun, while she was still at school.

Soundtrack
The film's soundtrack and background score was composed by a musician, S. A. Rajkumar. The soundtrack, released in 1999, features 7 tracks with lyrics written by Pazhani Bharathi.

Release
A critic from The Hindu wrote "Though the storyline is thin, the chock-n-block fisticuffs and slam-bang shoot-outs, along with the riveting performances by Arjun and Raghuvaran, keep you hooked onto a cinematic roller-coaster action ride. By hardly leaving any room for sentiment, it is quite obvious that Director Jagan seems to be influenced by the Hollywood action flicks. Even the action scenes are canned in that typical Hollywood style." A further critic noted "The movie completely falls apart in the climax".

References

1999 films
Indian crime action films
1990s crime action films
1990s Tamil-language films
Films scored by S. A. Rajkumar
Films about orphans
Films about contract killing in India
Indian remakes of French films
Indian films about revenge
1999 directorial debut films